Budisavljević is a Serbian surname. Notable people with the surname include:

 Diana Budisavljević (1891-1978), Austrian humanitarian
 Jovanka Broz (née Budisavljević, 1924-2013), First Lady of Yugoslavia
 Luka Budisavljević (born 2004), Serbian chess grandmaster
 Srđan Budisavljević (1883-1968), Yugoslav politician

Serbian surnames